Focus is the debut studio album by American metal band Cynic, released September 14, 1993 through Roadrunner Records. A remastered version of the album was released in 2004.

Overview and musical approach
After years of being hailed as a promising act in Florida's death metal scene, Cynic recorded Focus. The result was an album combining their love of death metal with other influences, notably jazz. Instead of choosing the brutal and hard-hitting approach to metal like most of their contemporaries, Focus takes an experimental stance to music.

The album features a hoarse, guttural, growling vocal style, provided by keyboardist Tony Teegarden. Lead singer Paul Masvidal said he was in danger of losing his voice at the time and thus did not perform the harsh vocals himself. As a result Masvidal recorded his own vocals using a vocoder, giving his voice a synthesized, robotic quality.

Individual players

The guitar parts of Masvidal and Jason Gobel intertwine, which Masvidal compared to guitar duos such as Television's Tom Verlaine and Richard Lloyd, or Robert Fripp and Adrian Belew from King Crimson.

Masvidal and Gobel use very similar gear throughout the record. Both play a Steinberger brand electric guitar equipped with a Roland MIDI pickup and guitar synthesizer, and both used ADA amplification. Most of the synthesized sounds on the album are generated with these guitar synthesizers, not keyboards. The Steinberger guitars also feature a tremolo system which bends each string an equal amount, allowing the bending of full chord shapes in tune. A demonstration of this is heard in the very first guitar chord of "I'm But a Wave to...".

Sean Malone plays a Kubicki fretless bass nearly throughout the album. The fretless bass has a soft attack and a round, warm sound rather atypical to heavy metal, which usually prefers the punchier attack of fretted bass. On some parts on Focus Malone plays a 12-string Chapman Stick instead.

Sean Reinert's drum style meshes together elements from both heavy metal and jazz. He uses accents, fills and varied dynamics to keep the songs rhythmically vivid. He occasionally plays a 16th-note double bass drum beat to emphasize certain parts of songs, but does not play blast beat on the album. In addition to an acoustic drum kit, he also uses electronic drums on some songs.

Lyrical approach
The lyrics, written by Masvidal, are poetic, philosophically and spiritually laden texts that take on subjects such as perceiving the world as whole, distinguishing reality and illusion, concentration and meditation. Many of the songs incorporate themes, titles or excerpts from other works: "Veil of Maya" takes its title from a George William Russell poem of the same name, while "Sentiment" quotes a prayer from Whispers from Eternity by Paramahansa Yogananda. Many influences from oriental mysticism and religions as well as some New Age themes are present. The whole lyrical perspective is positive, humane and humble, all rather atypical qualities within the realm of death metal.

Re-releases
In 2004 Roadrunner Records released a remastered version of Focus, which contained the original eight tracks and six bonus tracks. Three of these were remixes by John Hiler, while the three other songs are taken from the members' post-Cynic project Portal's eponymous demo. Portal featured almost the same lineup as Cynic. Sean Malone was replaced by Chris Kringel and a fifth member, Aruna Abrams, joined on vocals and keyboards. All Cynic songs were written by Cynic; all Portal songs were written by Portal. The remixed tracks feature the same lineup as the original release.

On 1 August 2022, it was announced that Masvidal and Warren Riker had completed a remix of Focus, with a release date to be determined.

Reception

Although Cynic were associated with the Florida death metal scene, Focus represented a significant departure musically from Death's Human and the early Cynic demo-tapes. It was therefore a hard album to market. Cynic found themselves touring to promote the album with brutal death metal band Cannibal Corpse and predictably received a mixed reception from their fans. When asked in an interview about the success of the 2007 reunion tour, Masvidal said:"...it was just really disorienting to hear a sea of 10,000 people singing ‘Veil of Maya’. You know, it was just wait, the last time we did this song I think a bottle hit my head and we were in Texas somewhere with Cannibal Corpse..."This negative reaction from within the metal scene was part of the reason Cynic broke up in 1994:"...We were just really sensitive, creative people that wanted to make music and we were devoured by the industry and we didn’t get a lot of support and people didn’t understand Focus at the time."Loudwire writer Graham Hartmann named Focus the ninth best debut metal album. In 2005 the album was placed number 496 in Rock Hard magazine's book The 500 Greatest Rock & Metal Albums of All Time. 

In the 2004 Focus reissue liner notes, Ula Gehret - music journalist, owner of Clandestine Music, and Century Media Europe manager wrote:"… on the Focus album musically, there isn’t a single track where you can cite a main influence or reference point of blatant plagiarism, unlike nearly every single debut album in your record collection, perhaps with the scant exception of a few truly groundbreaking bands such as Black Sabbath or Frank Zappa."

In the foreword from the Focus bass transcription book, Jeff Wagner, the author of Mean Deviation: Four Decades of Progressive Heavy Metal, and co-host of the podcast Radical Research – Adventures in Exceptional Musick wrote:"Despite it feeling completely of its time in 1993, if you listen to Focus now, it’s difficult to tell which era it was recorded in. It has no hallmarks of any particular time, drawing, as it does, from things going all the way back to jazz’s ‘60s renaissance, while feeling like music being beamed to Earth by some distant future race. At whatever present point you’re in, it holds up there too."

In 2009, Chris Dick of Decibel Magazine had praises for Focus:"Focus is, for all intents and purposes, superlative, and therefore the Hall of Fame rolls out the magic red carpet to induct the most significant progressive death metal (by association) record of all time."On the 20th anniversary of the album in 2013, the BazillionPoints.com blog presented an extract of Jeff Wagner's book Mean Deviation: Four Decades of Progressive Metal that gave Focus the recognition it deserved:"Even though it was met with confusion and even some good old spite upon release, Cynic's Focus has aged extremely well. There's no denying its impact over the past two decades. Now that progressive music of various kinds is more acceptable in the metal universe than it was in 1993, Focus takes its place alongside a rarified set of albums that continue to sell and find new generations of fans. Right up there with (METALLICA’s) …And Justice For All, (Death’s) Human, (Dream Theater's) Images And Words, and other essential pieces of brain metal."In 2019, Focus was featured in Issue #173 of OffYourRadar.com:"...This is unlike anything you’ve ever heard. Referred to as “Progressive Metal” because it progresses beyond simple catchy distorted guitar riffs and chugga-chugga aggression. This music ventures into the complex arrangements usually reserved for snooty experimental jazz clubs. Few metal bands sounded like this in 1993, but many would begin to incorporate these elements after this album was released." - Darryl Wright (@punksteez), Lovechild Of The Music & Technology Marriage

"There is so much that could go wrong on this Cynic album that its artistic success is a thrilling high-wire act. Sean Malone’s burbling, prog-jazz-fusion bass (somewhat reminiscent of Jamaaladeen Tacuma’s work for Ornette Coleman) would seem an unlikely playmate for the often serrated guitars of Paul Masvidal and Jason Gobel. Then you have vocals that alternate between sepulchral growls and robotic treatments seemingly inspired by the “Lord’s Prayer” section of Pink Floyd’s “Sheep.” The drums eschew a Bonham-esque groove for a busy polyrhythmic approach, with long fills that travel around what sounds like a big kit, which in hands other than Sean Reinert’s could be horribly distracting. Then they have the audacity to insert sections of limpid melodic beauty, arpeggiated layered guitars blending with synthesizers, creating a sense of yearning. But somehow it all works." - Jeremy Shatan (@anearful), Prescient & Appreciative Musical OmnivoreOn September 13, 2023, Focus will celebrate its 30th anniversary. In anticipation, blogger Into the Wells writes:"After years of being hailed as a promising act in Florida's Death Metal scene, Cynic recorded “Focus”. The result was an album combining their love of Death Metal with other influences, notably Jazz. Instead of choosing the brutal and hard-hitting approach to Metal like most of their contemporaries, “Focus” takes an experimental stance to music."

Influence on other artists
Atheist had previously fused death metal with jazz. Cynic itself has had a notable influence on some later bands. Echoes of Cynic's approach can be heard in the music of many later death metal bands such as Martyr, Aletheian, Decrepit Birth, Behold... the Arctopus, as well as some progressive metal bands such as Meshuggah, Spiral Architect, Sceptic, Between the Buried and Me and Continuo Renacer.

Deathcore/metalcore band Veil of Maya and progressive metal band Textures were each named after a track from this album. Focus has been cited as an influence by The Dillinger Escape Plan, Scale the Summit, Obscura and Scott Carstairs of Fallujah.

Track listing

Personnel
Focus album personnel adapted from the CD liner notes of the 2004 remaster.

Cynic 
 Paul Masvidal – vocals, guitar, guitar synth
 Jason Gobel – guitar, guitar synth
 Sean Malone – bass, Chapman Stick
 Sean Reinert – drums, keyboards
 Tony Teegarden - death growls

Additional personnel
 Sonia Otey – additional vocals
 Steve Gruden – additional vocals
 Aruna Abrams – keyboards, vocals (tracks 12–14; 2004 remaster)
 Chris Kringel – bass (tracks 12–14; 2004 remaster)

Technical personnel
 Cynic – production
 Scott Burns – production, engineering, mixing
 Robert Venosa – artwork

Technical personnel (2004 remaster)
 Tom Burleigh – production
 Paul Masvidal – production
 Sean Reinert – production
 Kevin Bartley – mastering (tracks 1–8)
 Mark Chalecki – mastering (tracks 9–14)
 John Hiler – remixing (tracks 9–11)
 Portal – production (tracks 12–14)
 Scott Burns – production, mixing (tracks 12–14)

References

External links
 

Cynic (band) albums
1993 debut albums
Roadrunner Records albums
Albums produced by Scott Burns (record producer)
Albums recorded at Morrisound Recording